Harbor Park is a Tide Light Rail station in Norfolk, Virginia. It opened in August 2011 and is situated in Downtown Norfolk along Park Avenue, adjacent to Harbor Park baseball stadium. 

The station is the first part of a planned intermodal public transport hub, which is intended to include bus, commuter rail and ferry services. In December 2012, a new Amtrak station opened adjacent to the station.

References

External links 
Harbor Park station

Tide Light Rail stations
Railway stations in the United States opened in 2011
2011 establishments in Virginia